Democratic Society Movement may refer to:

 a forerunner of the Kurdish Democratic Society Party in Turkey.
 Movement for a Democratic Society, an organ of the de facto autonomous region of Syrian Kurdistan (Rojava).